Marmaris National Park, established on March 8, 1996, is a national park in southwestern Turkey. The national park is located in Köyceğiz and Marmaris of districts Muğla Province.

Gallery

References

National parks of Turkey
Geography of Muğla Province
Landforms of Muğla Province
Tourist attractions in Muğla Province
Köyceğiz District
Marmaris
1996 establishments in Turkey
Protected areas established in 1996